The 2015–16 Rwanda National Football League, known as the Azam Rwanda Premier League for sponsorship reasons, is the 39th season of top-tier football in Rwanda. The season started on 18 September 2015 and concluded on 17 July 2016 with APR winning their third consecutive title and 16th overall, all in a span of 22 years.

Rayon Sports finished second to qualify for the 2017 CAF Confederation Cup while Rwamagana City and Muhanga finished 15th and 16th, respectively, and will be relegated to the Rwandan Second Division for the 2016-17 season.

Teams
A total of 16 teams will contest the league after it expanded from 14 teams in 2014-15. Isonga were relegated to the Second Division after finishing 14th. Bugesera, Muhanga and Rwamagana City are all new additions to the competition this year.

Stadiums and locations

League table

Results
All teams play in a double round robin system (home and away).

Results by round

Positions by round

References

Rwanda National Football League seasons
National Football League
National Football League
Rwanda